Ménfőcsanaki Sportegyesület is a professional football club based in Győr, Győr-Moson-Sopron County, Hungary, that competes in the Nemzeti Bajnokság III, the third tier of Hungarian football.

Name changes
 2017–present: Herold Trans-Ménfőcsanak ESK

Season results
As of 21 August 2018

External links
 Official website of Ménfőcsanaki SE
 Profile on Magyar Futball

References

Football clubs in Hungary
Association football clubs established in 1923
1923 establishments in Hungary